The Howrah–New Jalpaiguri Shatabdi Express is a Shatabdi class train of Indian Railways connecting Kolkata and Siliguri, West Bengal's two most important cities. It is the second fastest train after Howrah–New Jalpaiguri Vande Bharat Express in the Howrah – New Jalpaiguri section covering a distance of 561 km (chargeable distance may be different but it is same when it is being written) in a span of about 8 hours.

Overview 
West Bengal chief minister Mamata Banerjee and the then railway minister Mukul Roy flagged it off from New Jalpaiguri Junction railway station on 12 July 2012, though this train was passed in Railway Budget 2012–13 by the then Railway Minister Dinesh Trivedi. The train carried nine AC Chair Cars and one AC Executive Chair Car. The train belongs to the Northeast Frontier Railway zone of Indian Railways.

Before the electrification of Jalpaiguri-Howrah stretch, this Shatabdi Express was the fastest Diesel Locomotive hauled train of Indian Railways having its diesel link of class WDP-4, WDP-4B or WDP-4D provided by Siliguri Junction (SGUJ) DLS. On 10 January 2020 the traction of the train was changed to electric and the regular link was changed to class WAP-7 of Howrah Junction (HWH) ELS.

This is a very popular train on the Howrah - New Jalpaiguri route. It links the capital city of West Bengal, Kolkata with the largest city in North Bengal, Siliguri traversing through various other important places in the state.

Amenities
This train has LHB coach, providing reclining seats, on-board meals are available and are included in the ticket fare. On 10 March 2018, it was upgraded to the Swarna Standards of Indian Railways.

Speed
Its all coaches are of air conditioned LHB coach type which is capable of reaching 160 kmph but it does not touch. Sometimes people become confused because according to Indian Railways Permanent Way Manual (IRPWM) on Indian Railways website or Indian Railway Institute of Civil Engineering website, the BG (Broad Gauge) lines have been classified into six groups ‘A’ to ‘E’ on the basis of the future maximum permissible speeds but it may not be same as present speed.

The maximum permissible speed of the train and route is 130 kmph between Howrah and Khana which is about 108 km part via Dankuni of Howrah - New Delhi route  and speed is less in the rest part and the speed in rest part is same as maximum speed of the route which is 110 kmph over KAN-BDAG (Khana - Bonidanga) , presently unknown but 100 kmph in 2011 between Bonidanga (after Gumani - GMAN) and Malda Town (MLDT) 45 Km long part, 110 kmph between Malda Town and New Jalpaiguri which is a part of Guwahati – Malda Town route having 110 kmph sectional speed
 which will be increased to 130 kmph between Malda Town and New Jalpaiguri by March 2023

Route & halts 
 
The intermediate stations and the stoppage time are as follows-
 
  (Starts)
  (2 minutes)
  (2 minutes)
  (1 minute)
  (5 minutes)
  (1 minute)
  (2 minutes)
  (Ends)

Schedule 
The schedule of this 12041/12042 New Jalpaipuri Jn - Howrah Jn Shatabdi Express is given below:-

See also 
 Howrah–New Jalpaiguri Vande Bharat Express
 Howrah–New Jalpaiguri line

Notes

References

Shatabdi Express trains
Rail transport in West Bengal
Transport in Jalpaiguri
Rail transport in Howrah
Trains from Howrah Junction railway station
Transport in Siliguri
